Nùjiāng Lisu Autonomous Prefecture is an autonomous prefecture of western/northwestern Yunnan province, People's Republic of China.

Name
It is named after the Nujiang river (the longest undammed river in Southeast Asia) and the Lisu ethnic group.

Administration
The seat of the prefecture is Liuku Town, Lushui.

The prefecture is subdivided into four county-level divisions: one county-level city, one county, and two autonomous counties:

Demographics 
According to the 2000 Census Nujiang has 491,824 inhabitants with a population density of 33.45 inhabitants/km2.

Ethnic groups in Nujiang, 2000 census

External links

Nujiang Prefecture Official Website 

 
Autonomous prefectures of the People's Republic of China
Lisu people